Lières is a commune in the Pas-de-Calais department in the Hauts-de-France region of France.

Geography

Population

Places of interest
 The church of St. Adrien, dating from the fifteenth century.
 A farmhouse dating from the seventeenth century, all that remains of the ancient chateau.
 The feudal motte, with a deep moat.

See also
 Communes of the Pas-de-Calais department

References

Communes of Pas-de-Calais